Elmia Exhibition and Convention Centre is a trade fair in Jönköping, Sweden. The building was built in 1961 for agriculture trade fairs. Later it was expanded to also hold other trade fairs like boat and auto shows. The building has 34,000 square metres floor and is divided into 4 major halls and a few smaller ones.

One of the most popular activities at Elmia is Dreamhack, the biggest LAN party in the world, with over 21600 visitors and their computers.

The outdoor game of the 2011–12 Elitserien season, between HV71 and Linköpings HC, was played in a temporary outdoor arena at Elmia.

References

External links
Official site (in English & Swedish)

Trade fairs in Sweden
Economy of Sweden
Tourist attractions in Jönköping County
Buildings and structures in Jönköping
Convention centres in Sweden